Richardt Frenz (born 28 August 1992) is a South African first-class cricketer. He made his first-class debut for North West in the 2013–14 CSA Provincial Three-Day Competition on 27 March 2014.

References

External links
 

1992 births
Living people
South African cricketers
North West cricketers
Cricketers from Pretoria